Celtic Cup may refer to:

Celtic Cup (wheelchair rugby league), international tournament between Ireland, Scotland and Wales
Celtic Cup (underwater hockey), a round robin international underwater hockey tournament which began in 2022
Celtic Cup (ice hockey), a British university ice hockey competition
Celtic Cup (rugby union), a knock-out cup competition between Celtic League teams during 2003/04 and 2004/05 seasons
Celtic Cup (2018 rugby union tournament), a development competition between Celtic League teams from Ireland and Wales, beginning in 2018
Nations Cup (football), an international association football tournament held in 2011, also known as a Celtic Cup
Celtic League Cup, an ice hockey league contested by teams from both Scotland and Ireland